Loo Kum Zee (born 2 December 1974) is a Malaysian high jumper. His personal best jump is 2.24 metres, achieved in December 1995 in Chiangmai.

He won bronze medals at the Asian Championships in 1995, 1998, 2002 and 2003. He also competed at the 1996 Olympic Games, but did not reach the final.

He attended secondary school in SMJK Sam Tet, Ipoh, Perak.

Competition record

Honour

Honour of Malaysia
  : 
 Member of the Order of the Defender of the Realm (A.M.N.) (2013)

References

1974 births
Living people
Malaysian male high jumpers
Athletes (track and field) at the 1996 Summer Olympics
Olympic athletes of Malaysia
Athletes (track and field) at the 1994 Commonwealth Games
Athletes (track and field) at the 1998 Commonwealth Games
Commonwealth Games competitors for Malaysia
Athletes (track and field) at the 1994 Asian Games
Athletes (track and field) at the 1998 Asian Games
Athletes (track and field) at the 2002 Asian Games
Southeast Asian Games medalists in athletics
Southeast Asian Games gold medalists for Malaysia
Members of the Order of the Defender of the Realm
Competitors at the 2001 Southeast Asian Games
Competitors at the 2003 Southeast Asian Games
Asian Games medalists in athletics (track and field)
Asian Games bronze medalists for Malaysia
Medalists at the 1998 Asian Games